Torino Football Club Primavera are the under-19 team of Italian professional football club Torino Football Club. They play in the Campionato Primavera 1. In Italy they won 9 league titles. They also participate in the Coppa Italia Primavera, which they have won 7 times and in the annual Torneo di Viareggio, an international tournament which they won 6 times.

History

The Torino Primavera plays in the Campionato Nazionale Primavera in Group A, the most important youth league in Italian football. The competition is governed by the Lega Serie A and includes the youth teams of clubs participating in Serie A and Serie B. From the 2012–13 season, players from the age of 15 and players that have not turned 19 years old by the start of the season are eligible to compete.  At the discretion of the League, four "over age" players are eligible to compete.

Players

Current squad 
. Numbers refers to first team in Lega Serie A. For Primavera games numbers 1 to 11 are used.

 Honours 
 Campionato Nazionale Primavera: 9 (record)
 1966–67, 1967–68, 1969–70, 1976–77, 1984–85, 1987–88, 1990–91, 1991–92, 2014–15
 Coppa Italia Primavera: 8 (record)
 1982–83, 1983–84, 1985–86, 1987–88, 1988–89, 1989–90, 1998–99, 2017-18
 Supercoppa Primavera: 2
 2015, 2018
 Torneo di Viareggio: 6
 1984, 1985, 1987, 1989, 1995, 1998

 Youth system 

 History 
Campionato Nazionale Dante Berretti (U-18)
Allievi Nazionali (U-17)
Allievi B Nazionali (U-16)
Campionato Nazionale Giovanissimi (U-15)

 Graduates (2000–present)
Youth system graduates who have played for Torino, including those that are currently out on loan to other clubs.

 Staff As of 29 January 2014''.
Director of Youth Football: Massimo Bava
Technical Coordinator: Silvano Benedetti
Head of Observation: Andrea Fabbrini
Primavera
Head coach: Moreno Longo
Assistant coach: Domenico Rana
Goalkeeping coach: Paolo Di Sarno
Fitness coach: Paolo Nava
Medics: Paolo Battaglino and Enrico Buttafarro
Healthcare Professional: Andrea Orvieto
Dante Berretti
Head coach: Roberto Fogli
Fitness coach: Marcello Crispoltoni
Goalkeeping coach: Stefano Baroncini
Medic: Antonio Pastrone
Healthcare Professional: Alice Stefano
Allievi Nazionali
Head coach: Andrea Menghini
Fitness coach: Maurizio Pasqualini
Goalkeeping coach: Gianfranco Randazzo
Medic: Simone Spolaore
Healthcare Professional: Giorgio Pistone
Allievi Nazionali B
Head coach: Christian Fioratti
Fitness coach: Fabio D'Errico
Goalkeeping coach: Giuseppe Sangregorio
Healthcare Professional: Gianluca Beccia
Giovanissimi Nazionali
Head coach: Luca Mezzano
Assistant coach: Alessandro Malagrinò
Fitness coach: Roberto Pellegrino
Goalkeeping coach: Claudio Bassani
Medic: Giorgio Governale
Healthcare Professional: Paolo Iuiele

References

External links 
  Torino F.C. youth sector official website

Primavera
Sport in Turin
Football academies in Italy
UEFA Youth League teams